Captain Antoine Bollo was a French privateer in the time of the Napoleonic Wars.

In February 1809 he received command of the Furet, a 15-tonne privateer owned by Dominique  from Gena.

Year of birth missing
Year of death missing
French privateers